Paradise Lost is a 2011 Chinese teen sex comedy film and the sequel to the film Pubescence and the second film in the Pubescence film series. It was directed and written by Guan Xiaojie, starring Zhao Yihuan and Wang Yi. It was released in China on Singles Day.

Cast
 Zhao Yihuan as Cheng Xiaoyu
 Wang Yi as Wang Xiaofei
 Tian Xiaotian as Xiaotian
 Mo Xi'er as Xi'er
 Song Dan as Dandan
 Wang Zitong as Zitong
 Yang Ruijia as Li Mingyu
 Liang Tingyu as Da Qi
 Li Hongtao as Bobo
 Cheng Zicheng as Houzi
 Tangchao Yucheng as Huazi
 Qin Hanlei as Yuan Xianglin, PE teacher
 Yuan Yixin as Xia Tian, PE teacher

Soundtrack
 Sunny Xie - "Double Face"

References

External links
 

2010s teen comedy films
Chinese sex comedy films
Films directed by Guan Xiaojie
2011 comedy films
2011 films